Hear No Evil is a 1993 American thriller film directed by Robert Greenwald, starring Marlee Matlin, D. B. Sweeney and Martin Sheen. It was released by 20th Century Fox on March 26, 1993. Matlin and Sheen would later co-star on the television series The West Wing.

Plot
Jillian Shanahan, a deaf woman, and an athletic trainer, is unaware that her client, Mickey O'Malley, has hidden a stolen rare coin in her pager. After Mickey gets arrested at Jillian's apartment by Lt. Brock, a corrupt police officer, he gets interrogated by him in the back of a police car under the bridge. After that, he returns to Jillian's apartment, only to find Jillian is not there. He later goes to a diner owned by his friend Ben Kendall and tries to call Jillian, but does not get a response. Soon after, he leaves the diner in Ben's car. He is killed when the car gets blown up on the bridge, and the car lands in the river below. Ben begins to suspect that Lt. Brock is behind Mickey's death as well as series of terrifying threats that Jillian begins to receive. After that, Jillian and Ben are being stalked by a killer who also wants the coin.

Cast
 Marlee Matlin as Jillian Shanahan
 D. B. Sweeney as Ben Kendall
 Martin Sheen as Lt. Brock
 John C. McGinley as Mickey O'Malley
 Christine Carllisi as Grace
 Greg Wayne Elam as Cooper
 Charley Lang as Wiley

Production
Principal photography began on May 4, 1992. Filming took place in and around Portland, Oregon where the film is set. Other locations in Portland including the Hawthorne Bridge, Mount Tabor Park, the Union Station, the Willamette River and at the Timberline Lodge at Mount Hood, Oregon where the final climax of the film is shot. Production officially wrapped on June 26, 1992.

Release
Hear No Evil was released on March 26, 1993 in 1,430 theaters. It ranked at #6 at the box-office, making $2.6 million in its opening weekend. It went on to gross $5.6 million in its theatrical run.

Reception
The film received negative reviews from film critics and has a 20% rating on Rotten Tomatoes based on 10 reviews.

Home video
Hear No Evil was released on VHS on August 11, 1993 and on DVD on September 7, 2004.

See also
 List of films featuring the deaf and hard of hearing

References

External links
 
 
 
 

1993 films
1990s mystery thriller films
American mystery thriller films
Films about deaf people
Films about murderers
Films about stalking
Films directed by Robert Greenwald
Films scored by Graeme Revell
Films set in Oregon
Films shot in Portland, Oregon
20th Century Fox films
Films with screenplays by Danny Rubin
1990s English-language films
1990s American films